Depository Library Act of 1962 is a federal statute revising the depository library laws passed in the United States from 1895 to 1939. The Act of Congress mandated the availability of U.S. government publications through the Superintendent of Documents for public information. The statute established requirements for two depository libraries as allocated by U.S. Congressional representatives per their respective congressional districts. The U.S. federal law provided provisions appointing land-grant colleges and the United States service academies as depository libraries for U.S. government publications. The 87th U.S. Congressional legislation authorized regional depository libraries allocating two depository libraries per U.S. state as defined by a United States Senator. The Act repealed Public Law 76-281 designating the United States Coast Guard Academy library as a depository of U.S. government publications while redelegating the New London, Connecticut office of the Superintendent of Documents.

Revised Depository Library Laws
Chronological timeline of depository library laws revised by the Depository Library Act of 1962.

See also
 Federal Depository Library Program
 Freedom of Information Act
 Freedom of information in the United States

External links
 
 
 
 
 
 

1962 in American law
87th United States Congress
Federal depository libraries
Deposit libraries
United States government information
Legislative branch of the United States government
United States federal government administration legislation